Janez "Jani" Klemenčič (born 21 September 1971) is a former Slovenian rower and Olympic medallist at the 1992 Summer Olympics. He competed in four consecutive Summer Olympics for his native country.

References

1971 births
Living people
Sportspeople from Jesenice, Jesenice
Slovenian male rowers
Olympic rowers of Slovenia
Rowers at the 1992 Summer Olympics
Rowers at the 1996 Summer Olympics
Rowers at the 2000 Summer Olympics
Rowers at the 2004 Summer Olympics
Olympic bronze medalists for Slovenia
Olympic medalists in rowing
Medalists at the 1992 Summer Olympics
World Rowing Championships medalists for Slovenia
21st-century Slovenian people